Daniel Thomas Jenkins (December 2, 1928 – March 7, 2019) was an American author and sportswriter who often wrote for Sports Illustrated. He was also a high-standard amateur golfer who played college golf at Texas Christian University.

Early life 
Jenkins was born in 1928 and raised in Fort Worth, Texas, where he attended R. L. Paschal High School and Texas Christian University (TCU), where he played on the varsity golf team.

Career
Jenkins worked for many publications including the Fort Worth Press, Dallas Times Herald, Playboy, and Sports Illustrated, where among other things he covered the 1966, 1967, 1969, and 1971 versions of the college football Game of the Century. In 1985, he retired from Sports Illustrated and began writing books full-time, although he maintained a monthly column in Golf Digest magazine.

Larry King called Jenkins "the quintessential Sports Illustrated writer" and "the best sportswriter in America." Jenkins wrote numerous works and over 500 articles for Sports Illustrated. In 1972, Jenkins wrote his first novel, Semi-Tough. His daughter Sally Jenkins is a sports columnist for The Washington Post.

In December 2014, Jenkins published an article in Golf Digest titled "My (Fake) interview with Tiger; or how it plays out in my mind." In the piece, which featured images of a Tiger Woods lookalike in golfing gear, Jenkins mocks Woods's reputation in an imaginary interview with the athlete. Though the piece was clearly marked as parody, the champion golfer requested an apology from the magazine. Woods stated that the piece "fails as parody, and is really more like a grudge-fueled piece of character assassination."

Awards and honors
2012 PEN/ESPN Lifetime Achievement Award for Literary Sports Writing
2012 World Golf Hall of Fame, Lifetime Achievement Category
2013 Red Smith Award
2015 Old Tom Morris Award
2017 Ring Lardner Award for Excellence in Sports Journalism

Books

References

External links
Dan Jenkins on Golf Digest

Podcast with Dan Jenkins in September, 2018

American male golfers
American memoirists
American sportswriters
TCU Horned Frogs men's golfers
World Golf Hall of Fame inductees
Red Smith Award recipients
Sportspeople from Fort Worth, Texas
Writers from Texas
1928 births
2019 deaths